Twin Valley High School is a public high school located in Pilgrim Knob in Buchanan County, Virginia. It is part of the Buchanan County Public Schools system and was founded in 2001 with the consolidation of the former Garden and Whitewood High Schools. The school is the second largest public high school in Buchanan County with an enrollment of slightly over 200 students (2018–2019 estimate).

Athletics
The school has many sports including football, basketball, softball, baseball, tennis, golf, track & field, volleyball, cross country, and a theatre team.

The Twin Valley athletic teams compete in the Virginia High School League's Division A Black Diamond District in Region D.

Teaching
The school takes on the Standards of Learning test issued by the Virginia Department of Education. The test demonstrates what the student knows about the specific subject and if the student needs to retake the class.

References 

Schools in Buchanan County, Virginia
Public high schools in Virginia
Educational institutions established in 2001
2001 establishments in Virginia